Atterberry is an unincorporated community in Menard County, Illinois, United States.

References

Unincorporated communities in Menard County, Illinois
Unincorporated communities in Illinois